The Midnight Room is the fifth studio album by the Italian psychedelic rock band Jennifer Gentle, released in 2007.

Track listing

 Twin Ghosts	
 Telephone Ringing 	
 It's In Her Eyes 	
 Take My Hand 	
 The Ferryman 	
 Electric Princess 	
 Quarter To Three 	
 Mercury Blood 	
 Granny's House 	
 Come Closer

References

Jennifer Gentle albums
2007 albums